David Sosebee (born December 8, 1955 in Dawsonville, Georgia) is a retired NASCAR Winston Cup Series race car driver who competed from 1979 to 1988. He is the son of racer Gober Sosebee.

Summary
Sosebee only failed to qualify for one race; the 1988 Atlanta Journal 500 that took place in Hampton, Georgia. While starting an average of 33rd place, his average finishers are in 31st place. David would participate in 1,673 laps of professional stock car racing while leading in none of them. His total career earnings added up to $35,210 ($ when adjusted for inflation). Sosebee started racing at the age of 23 and stopped at the age of 32.

Sosebee performed best on restrictor plate tracks with his average finish of 28th place; his worst performances were on intermediate tracks; where he would finish 33rd place on average.

Motorsports career results

NASCAR
(key) (Bold – Pole position awarded by qualifying time. Italics – Pole position earned by points standings or practice time. * – Most laps led.)

Winston Cup Series

References

External links
 

1955 births
Living people
People from Dawsonville, Georgia
Sportspeople from the Atlanta metropolitan area
Racing drivers from Georgia (U.S. state)
NASCAR drivers